Theism is broadly defined as the belief in the existence of at least one deity. In common parlance, or when contrasted with deism, the term often describes the classical conception of God that is found in monotheism (also referred to as classical theism) — or gods found in polytheistic religions — a belief in God or in gods without the rejection of revelation as is characteristic of deism.  Gnosticism is the belief in personal spiritual knowledge. 

Atheism is commonly understood as non-acceptance or rejection of theism in the broadest sense of theism, i.e. non-acceptance or rejection of belief in God or gods. Related, but separate, is the claim that the existence of any deity is unknown or unknowable: agnosticism. Combined with theism, is agnostic theism.

Etymology
The term theism derives from the Greek  (theós) or theoi meaning "god" or "gods". The term theism was first used by Ralph Cudworth (1617–1688). In Cudworth's definition, they are "strictly and properly called Theists, who affirm, that a perfectly conscious understanding being, or mind, existing of itself from eternity, was the cause of all other things".

Types of theism

Monotheism

Monotheism (from Greek ) is the belief in theology that only one deity exists. Some modern day monotheistic religions include Judaism, Christianity, Islam, Baháʼí Faith, Sikhism, Zoroastrianism, some Sects of Hinduism, and Eckankar.

Polytheism
Polytheism is the belief in multiple deities, which are usually assembled into a pantheon, along with their own religious sects and rituals.  Polytheism was the typical form of religion before the development and spread of the Abrahamic religions of Judaism, Christianity, and Islam, which enforce monotheism. It is well documented throughout history, from prehistory and the earliest records of ancient Egyptian religion and ancient Mesopotamian religion to the religions prevalent during Classical antiquity, such as ancient Greek religion and ancient Roman religion, and in ethnic religions such as Germanic, Slavic, and Baltic paganism and Native American religions.

Notable polytheistic religions practiced today include Taoism, Shenism or Chinese folk religion, Japanese Shinto, Santería, most Traditional African religions, various neopagan faiths such as Wicca. Hinduism, while popularly held as polytheistic, cannot be exclusively categorised as such as some Hindus consider themselves to be pantheists and others consider themselves to be monotheists. Both are compatible with Hindu texts, since there exists no consensus of standardisation in the faith. Vedanta, the most dominant school of Hinduism, offers a combination of monotheism and polytheism, holding that Brahman is the sole ultimate reality of the universe, yet unity with it can be reached by worshipping multiple gods and goddesses.

A major division in modern polytheistic practices is between so-called soft polytheism and hard polytheism. "Soft" polytheism is the belief that different gods may either be psychological archetypes, personifications of natural forces, or as being one essential god interpreted though the lenses of different cultures (e.x. Odin, Zeus, and Indra all being the same god as interpreted by Germanic, Greek, and Indic peoples respectively) – known as omnitheism. In this way, gods may be interchangeable for one another across cultures. "Hard" polytheism is the belief that gods are distinct, separate, real divine beings, rather than psychological archetypes or personifications of natural forces. Hard polytheists reject the idea that "all gods are one essential god" and may also reject the existence of gods outside their own pantheon altogether.

Polytheism is further divided according to how the individual deities are regarded:

 Henotheism Henotheism is the viewpoint / belief that there may be more than one deity, but that only one of them is to be worshiped. Zoroastrianism is an example. 
 Kathenotheism Kathenotheism is the viewpoint / belief that there is more than one deity, but only one deity is worshiped at a time or ever, and another may be worthy of worship at another time or place. If they are worshiped one at a time, then each is supreme in turn.
 Monolatrism Monolatrism is the belief that there may be more than one deity, but that only one is worthy of being worshiped. Most of the modern monotheistic religions may have begun as monolatric ones, although this is disputed.

Pantheism
Pantheism is the belief that reality, the universe and the cosmos are identical to divinity and a supreme being or entity, pointing to the universe as being an immanent creator deity who is still expanding and creating, which has existed since the beginning of time, or that all things compose an all-encompassing, immanent god or goddess and regards the universe as a manifestation of a deity. This includes all astronomical objects being viewed as part of a sole deity. The worship of all gods of every religion is another definition but it is more precisely termed Omnism.
Pantheist belief does not recognize a distinct personal god, anthropomorphic or otherwise, but instead characterizes a broad range of doctrines differing in forms of relationships between reality and divinity. Pantheistic concepts date back thousands of years, and pantheistic elements have been identified in various religious traditions. The term pantheism was coined by mathematician Joseph Raphson in 1697 and since then, it has been used to describe the beliefs of a variety of people and organizations. Pantheism was popularized in Western culture as a theology and philosophy based on the work of the 17th-century philosopher Baruch Spinoza, in particular, his book Ethics. A pantheistic stance was also taken in the 16th century by philosopher and cosmologist Giordano Bruno.

Deism

 Classical Deism Classical deism is the belief that one God exists and created the world, but that the Creator does not alter the original plan for the universe, but presides over it in the form of Providence; however, some classical Deists did believe in divine intervention.
Deism typically rejects supernatural events (such as prophecies, miracles, and divine revelations) prominent in organized religion. Instead, Deism holds that religious beliefs must be founded on human reason and observed features of the natural world, and that these sources reveal the existence of a supreme being as creator.
 Pandeism Pandeism is the belief that God preceded the universe and created it, but is now equivalent with it.
 PolydeismPolydeism is the belief that multiple gods exist, but do not intervene in the universe.

Autotheism

Autotheism Autotheism is the viewpoint that divinity, whether also external or not, is inherently within 'oneself' and that one has the ability to become godlike. Indian religions like Buddhism and Jainism are Autotheistic. This can be in a selfless way, a way following the implications of statements attributed to ethical, philosophical, and religious leaders (such as Mahavira).

Autotheism can also refer to the belief that one's self is a deity, within the context of subjectivism. Hindus use the term, "aham Brahmāsmi" which means, "I am Brahman".

Mormons teach a type of Autotheism called Exaltation, where humans can attain godhood.

Value-judgment theisms
 Eutheism Eutheism is the belief that a deity is wholly benevolent.
 Dystheism Dystheism is the belief that a deity is not wholly good, and is possibly evil.
 Maltheism Maltheism is the belief that a deity exists, but is wholly malicious.
 Misotheism Misotheism is active hatred for God or gods.

Non-theism and atheism 
 Atheism  Atheism is the lack of belief in supernatural powers such as deities, gods / goddesses, or messiahs. Some atheists express an active disbelief or rejection of the existence of such entities.

 Non-theism Non-theism is the belief in no gods or god.

 Agnosticism  Agnosticism is the belief that it is not possible for any person to genuinely know whether deities or the supernatural are actually true to their descriptions, or are mere fabrications, regardless of sincerity. Agnostics reject either theistic or deistic beliefs as established facts, and only accept such as unsubstantiated opinion, whether regarding their own beliefs or others'.

Alterity theism 
Alterity theism is a belief that god is radically transcendent, radically other, to such an extent that god cannot be recognized with any being.

See also
Antitheism
Apeirotheism
Āstika and nāstika
Classical theism
Deism
Theistic evolution

References